The M3 Road is a road in northern Zambia that connects Kasama in the Northern Province with the Congo Pedicle border at Chembe in the Luapula Province via Luwingu and Mansa. The road contains two tollgates between Kasama and Mansa.

The south-western section of the M3 Road is the 1st section of a shortcut that exists between the Luapula and Copperbelt Provinces of Zambia, as the area in-between the 2 provinces is owned by the Democratic Republic of the Congo. At the Chembe Bridge, the M3 becomes the Congo Pedicle road to the Copperbelt, which is a road maintained by Zambia on Congolese Territory.

Route
The M3 Road begins in Kasama (Capital of the Northern Province), at a junction with the M1 Road in the city centre next to the Kasama Golf Course. It goes westwards for 24 kilometres, bypassing Kasama Airport, to reach a junction with the D20 Road, which provides access to the Chishimba Falls and the town of Mporokoso in the northwest.

From the D20 junction, the M3 continues westwards for 135 kilometres, through the Kalense Toll Plaza, to the town of Luwingu in the district of the same name. Just after Luwingu, the M3 Road crosses into the Luapula Province. From Luwingu, the road goes westwards for 100 kilometres to reach a t-junction in Chipili District, where it meets the southern terminus of the M13 Road.

As the M13 Road ends at this junction, the M3 Road becomes the road southwards. It proceeds for 78 kilometres, through the town of Chipili, through the Ntoposhi Toll Plaza, to the city of Mansa (Capital of the Luapula Province). In Mansa, the M3 meets the D94 Road, which provides access to the resort town of Samfya on the south-western shore of Lake Bangweulu in the east.

From Mansa, the M3 road goes southwards for 90 kilometres to reach the Chembe Border, where it crosses the Luapula River as the Mwanawasa Bridge (named after Levy Mwanawasa; also known as the Chembe Bridge) into the Democratic Republic of the Congo to become the Congo Pedicle road, which is a road maintained by Zambia on Congolese territory and which is used as a shortcut for motorists travelling from the Luapula Province (and Northern Province) to the Copperbelt Province (and North-Western Province).

It becomes the M5 Road at the Copperbelt end of the Congo Pedicle Road. The Congo Pedicle Road is designated as the N36 Route on the DR Congo road network.

Congo Pedicle road

The Congo Pedicle road is an important road, as it provides motorists in towns located in the Luapula Province (and Northern Province) with easier access to towns located in the Copperbelt and North-Western provinces.

It provides a much shorter route than the very-long circular route through Samfya, Serenje and Kapiri Mposhi for motorists wanting to travel from Mansa to the north-western area of the country and to the country's industrial and commercial hub of the Copperbelt.

The M3 Road is the road that provides access to the Congo Pedicle territory and eventually the town of Mufulira in the Copperbelt Province from the towns of the Luapula province, making it an important route for motorists planning to save on fuel and planning to avoid spending hours on the road.

See also
Roads in Zambia

References

Roads in Zambia
Luapula Province
Northern Province, Zambia